John Addison Gurley (December 9, 1813 – August 19, 1863) was a U.S. Congressman from Ohio during the early part of the American Civil War, serving two terms from 1859 to 1863. He was appointed as the first Governor of the Arizona Territory, but died before taking office.

Biography 
Gurley was born in East Hartford, Connecticut. He attended the district schools and received academic instruction before becoming an apprentice in the hatter’s trade. He studied theology and became a minister, serving as pastor of the Universalist Church in Methuen, Massachusetts, from 1835–1838. He moved west to Cincinnati, Ohio, in 1838 and became owner and editor of the Star and Sentinel, later called the Star in the West, and also served as a pastor in that city. Gurley retired from the ministry in 1850, sold his newspaper in 1854 and retired to his farm near Cincinnati.

He was the unsuccessful Republican candidate for election in 1856 to the Thirty-fifth United States Congress. However, he was elected to the Thirty-sixth and Thirty-seventh Congresses (March 4, 1859–March 3, 1863). Gurley was an unsuccessful candidate for reelection in 1862 to the Thirty-eighth Congress.

During the Civil War, Gurley served as colonel and aide-de-camp on the staff of Gen. John C. Frémont in 1861 when Congress was not in session. In 1863, Gurley was appointed Governor of the Arizona Territory by President Abraham Lincoln, but he died of a sudden attack of appendicitis in Green Township, near Cincinnati, on the eve of his departure to assume his duties. He was buried in Spring Grove Cemetery in Cincinnati.  Granite Mountain (Arizona), a prominent feature outside Prescott, Arizona was originally named Mount Gurley in his honor.

References 

 Universalist Register bio of Gurley

People from East Hartford, Connecticut
Politicians from Cincinnati
People of Ohio in the American Civil War
Burials at Spring Grove Cemetery
Clergy of the Universalist Church of America
American milliners
1813 births
1863 deaths
19th-century American newspaper publishers (people)
19th-century American journalists
Deaths from appendicitis
American male journalists
19th-century American male writers
19th-century American politicians
Republican Party members of the United States House of Representatives from Ohio
19th-century American clergy